Gorgopas is a genus of skippers in the family Hesperiidae.

Species
Recognised species in the genus Gorgopas include:
 Gorgopas agylla (Mabille, 1898)
 Gorgopas chlorocephala (Herrich Schäffer, 1870)
 Gorgopas extensa (Mabille, 1891)
 Gorgopas petale (Mabille, 1888)
 Gorgopas trochilus (Hopffer, 1874)

References

Natural History Museum Lepidoptera genus database

Carcharodini
Hesperiidae genera
Taxa named by Osbert Salvin
Taxa named by Frederick DuCane Godman